Caloptilia teucra is a moth of the family Gracillariidae. It is known from Hong Kong and Java, Indonesia.

The larvae feed on Bridelia species. They mine the leaves of their host plant.

References

teucra
Moths of Asia
Moths described in 1933